An optical bar camera is a type of long-focal-length panoramic camera used for panoramic images; e.g., for high-altitude or satellite reconnaissance.

Itek KA-80
Itek KA-80/A developed for the Teledyne Ryan AQM-91 Firefly, then also used in A-12, Lockheed U-2 and SR-71 reconnaissance aircraft.

Apollo Panoramic Camera
Itek KA-80A derivative with 24-inch focal length used in Apollo program to map parts of the moon. Used on Apollo 15–17.

Perkin-Elmer KH-9 OBC
See Optical Bar Cameras

See also 
 DB-110

References

External links
Optical Bar Cameras Characteristics and diagrams

Panoramic cameras